

Spilauersee is a lake in the Canton of Uri, Switzerland, below Rossstock. The lake can be reached by foot in half an hour from the Chäppeliberg–Lidernen cable car (or aerial tramway).

See also
List of mountain lakes of Switzerland

Lakes of Switzerland
Lakes of the canton of Uri